Wendy Wasserstein (October 18, 1950 – January 30, 2006) was an American playwright.  She was an Andrew Dickson White Professor-at-Large at Cornell University. She received the Tony Award for Best Play and the Pulitzer Prize for Drama in 1989 for her play The Heidi Chronicles.

Biography

Early years
Wasserstein was born to a Jewish family in Brooklyn, the daughter of Morris Wasserstein, a wealthy textile executive, and his wife, Lola (née Liska) Schleifer, who moved to the United States from Poland when her father was accused of being a spy. Wasserstein "once described her mother as being like 'Auntie Mame'". Lola Wasserstein reportedly inspired some of her daughter's characters. Wendy was the youngest of five siblings, including brother Bruce Wasserstein, a well-known investment banker.

Her maternal grandfather was Simon Schleifer, a yeshiva teacher in Włocławek, Poland, who moved to Paterson, New Jersey, and became a high school principal. Claims that Schleifer was a playwright are probably apocryphal, as contemporaries did not recall this and the assertion only appeared once Wasserstein had won the Pulitzer Prize for Drama.

A graduate of the Calhoun School (she attended from 1963 to 1967), Wasserstein earned a B.A. in history from Mount Holyoke College in 1971, an M.A. in creative writing from City College of New York in 1973, and an M.F.A. in fine arts from the Yale School of Drama in 1976. In 1990 she received an honoris causa Doctor of Humane Letters degree from Mount Holyoke College and in 2002 she received an honoris causa degree from Bates College.

Career
Wasserstein's first production of note was Uncommon Women and Others (her graduate thesis at Yale), a play which reflected her experiences as a student at, and an alumna of, Mount Holyoke College. The play was workshopped at the Eugene O’Neill Theater Center in 1977, 
and a full version of the play was produced in 1977 Off-Broadway with Glenn Close, Jill Eikenberry, and Swoosie Kurtz playing the lead roles. The play was subsequently produced for PBS with Meryl Streep replacing Close. While at Yale, she co-wrote a musical with fellow student Christopher Durang, When Dinah Shore Ruled the Earth.

In 1989, she won the Tony Award, the Susan Smith Blackburn Prize, and the Pulitzer Prize for Drama for her play The Heidi Chronicles.

Her plays, which explore topics ranging from feminism to family to ethnicity to pop culture, include The Sisters Rosensweig, Isn't It Romantic, An American Daughter, Old Money, and her last work, which opened in 2005, Third.

During her career, which spanned nearly four decades, Wasserstein wrote eleven plays, winning a Tony Award, a Pulitzer Prize, a New York Drama Critics Circle Award, a Drama Desk Award, and an Outer Critics Circle Award.

In addition, she wrote the screenplay for the 1998 film The Object of My Affection, which starred Jennifer Aniston and Paul Rudd.

Wasserstein is described as an author of women's identity crises. "Her heroines—intelligent and successful but also riddled with self-doubt—sought enduring love a little ambivalently, but they did not always find it, and their hard-earned sense of self-worth was often shadowed by the frustrating knowledge that American women's lives continued to be measured by their success at capturing the right man." In a conversation with novelist A. M. Homes, Wasserstein said that these heroines are the starting points for her plays: "I write from character, so it begins with people talking, which is why I like writing plays."

Wasserstein commented that her parents allowed her to go to Yale only because they were certain she would meet an eligible lawyer there, get married, and lead a conventional life as a wife and mother. Although appreciative of the critical acclaim for her comedic streak, she described her work as "a political act", wherein sassy dialogue and farcical situations mask deep, resonant truths about intelligent, independent women living in a world still ingrained with traditional roles and expectations.

In 2007 she was featured in the film Making Trouble, a tribute to female Jewish comedians, produced by the Jewish Women's Archive.

Wasserstein also wrote the books to two musicals. Miami, written in collaboration with Jack Feldman and Bruce Sussman, was presented at Playwrights Horizons in 1985–1986, and starred among others, Marcia Lewis, Phyllis Newman, Jane Krakowski, and Fisher Stevens. Pamela's First Musical, written with Cy Coleman and David Zippel, based on Wasserstein's children's book, received its world premiere in a concert staging at Town Hall in New York City on May 18, 2008.

She wrote the libretto for the opera Best Friends, based on Clare Boothe Luce's play The Women, but it was uncompleted when she died.  It was subsequently completed by Christopher Durang, set by Deborah Drattell, and is in development with Lauren Flanigan.

In 1996 she appeared as the guest caller "Linda" on the Frasier episode "Head Game".

Wasserstein was named the President's Council of Cornell Women Andrew D. White Professor-at-Large in 2005.

Personal life and death 
Wasserstein gave birth to a daughter in 1999 when she was 48 years old. The baby was three months premature and is recorded in Wasserstein's collection of essays, Shiksa Goddess. Wasserstein, who was not married, never publicly identified her daughter's father.

Wasserstein was hospitalized with lymphoma in December 2005 and died at Memorial Sloan Kettering Cancer Center on January 30, 2006, at age 55. News of her  death was unexpected because her illness had not been widely publicized outside the theater community. The night after she died, Broadway's lights were dimmed in her honor. In addition to her daughter, Wasserstein was survived by her mother and three siblings, Abner Wasserstein, businessman Bruce Wasserstein (who died in 2009), and Wilburton Inn owner Georgette Wasserstein Levis (who died in 2014).

Bibliography

Plays
 Third (2004, Washington, DC; 2005 Off-Broadway)
 Welcome to My Rash (2004)
 Psyche In Love (2004) - Tribeca Theater Festival 
 Old Money (2000)
 An American Daughter (1997)
 The Sisters Rosensweig (1992)
 The Heidi Chronicles (1988)
 The Man in a Case (1985)
 Tender Offer (1983)
 Isn't It Romantic (1981)
 Uncommon Women and Others (1977)
 Any Woman Can't (1973)

Screenplays
 The Object of My Affection (1998)
 Tender Offer (1977)

Books
 
 
 
 
 

Essays
 

 Papers 
The Wendy Wasserstein Papers, 1954–2006, are available to researchers at the Mount Holyoke College Archives and Special Collections. The finding aid for this collection is available online at http://asteria.fivecolleges.edu/findaids/mountholyoke/mshm325_main.html .

Awards
 1983: John Simon Guggenheim Fellowship
 1989: Pulitzer Prize for Drama – The Heidi Chronicles 1989: Tony Award for Best Play – The Heidi Chronicles 1989: Outer Critics Circle Award – The Heidi Chronicles 1989: Drama Desk Award – The Heidi Chronicles 1989: Susan Smith Blackburn Prize – The Heidi Chronicles 1993: Outer Critics Circle Award – The Sisters Rosensweig''
 1993: William Inge Award for Distinguished Achievement in American Theatre
 2006: American Theater Hall of Fame

References

External links

The Year of Wendy Wasserstein, 2011–2012, a year-long retrospective celebration at Mount Holyoke College 
Audio: Wendy Wasserstein at the Key West Literary Seminar, 2005

 Jan Balakian, Wasserstein biography at Jewish Women Encyclopedia

2001 BOMB Magazine interview of Wendy Wasserstein by A.M. Homes

1950 births
2006 deaths
20th-century American dramatists and playwrights
20th-century American women writers
21st-century American dramatists and playwrights
21st-century American women writers
American feminists
American people of Polish-Jewish descent
American women dramatists and playwrights
City College of New York alumni
Cornell University faculty
Deaths from cancer in New York (state)
Deaths from lymphoma
Jewish American dramatists and playwrights
Jewish feminists
Jewish women writers
Mount Holyoke College alumni
Pulitzer Prize for Drama winners
Tony Award winners
Writers from Brooklyn
Yale School of Drama alumni
American women academics
20th-century American Jews
21st-century American Jews